Proletarian Liberation Party (in Portuguese: Partido da Libertação Proletária) was a political party in Brazil. It was formed in 1989 by the Coletivos Gregório Bezerra, a dissident group of the Brazilian Communist Party. The founders of PLP opposed the support by PCB and other left formations for the candidacy of Lula da Silva in the presidential elections.

PLP oriented itself towards Trotskyism.

In 1994 PLP merged into the PSTU.

1989 establishments in Brazil
1994 disestablishments in Brazil
Communist parties in Brazil
Defunct political parties in Brazil
Political parties disestablished in 1994
Political parties established in 1989
Trotskyist organisations in Brazil